Oseas Guiñazú Estrella was an Argentine politician of the late 19th century.  He served as interim governor of Mendoza Province from 1890 until 1891, succeeding Domingo Bombal in the position.

References
Los Andes y la cultura de Mendoza

Governors of Mendoza Province
Year of death missing
Year of birth missing